Bardonia is a hamlet and census-designated place in the town of Clarkstown, Rockland County, New York, United States. It is located northeast of Nanuet, northwest of West Nyack, south of New City, and west of Valley Cottage.  The population was 4,108 at the 2010 census.

Bardonia is north of the New York State Thruway.

Bardonia is named for the Bardon brothers - John and the twins Phillip and Conrad - who came from Bavaria in 1849 and opened several businesses. The Bardonia railroad station, which no longer exists, was opened there in 1875.

Geography
Bardonia is located at  (41.114128, -73.983042).

Demographics

At the 2012 census, there were 4,367 people, 1,450 households and 1,189 families residing in the CDP. The population density was 1,704.6 per square mile (658.6/km2). There were 1,468 housing units at an average density of 573.0/sq mi (221.4/km2). The racial makeup of the CDP was 87.54% white, 1.53% African American, .23% Native American, 7.88% Asian, 1.4% from other races, and 1.42% from two or more races. Hispanic or Latino of any race were 5.15% of the population.

There were 1,450 households, of which 38.1% had children under the age of 18 living with them, 72.7% were married couples living together, 7.0% had a female householder with no husband present, and 18.0% were non-families. 15.9% of all households were made up of individuals, and 9.6% had someone living alone who was 65 years of age or older. The average household size was 3.01 and the average family size was 3.37.

Age distribution was 25.2% under the age of 18, 7.1% from 18 to 24, 23.8% from 25 to 44, 31.0% from 45 to 64, and 12.9% who were 65 years of age or older. The median age was 41 years. For every 100 females, there were 94 males. For every 100 females age 18 and over, there were 90.8 males.

The median household income was $96,068, and the median family income was $104,415. Males had a median income of $70,060 versus $43,700 for females. The per capita income for the CDP was $37,677. About .8% of families and 1.4% of the population were below the poverty line, including 2.3% of those under age 18 and 1.4% of those age 65 or over. Bardonia (within Clarkstown) was the 2nd safest town in the U.S in a recent study.

Education
Bardonia is located within the Clarkstown Central School District's boundaries. The district's 'Bardonia Elementary School serves the hamlet. Secondary students from Bardonia attend Felix Festa Middle School and Clarkstown South High School in nearby West Nyack. The private Catholic Albertus Magnus High School is also located in Bardonia.

Transportation

Bardonia was previously served by the New Jersey and New York Railroad's New City Branch, which was later incorporated into the Erie Railroad system. Service along the New City Branch ended in 1939, and the tracks were quickly removed thereafter. The old Bardonia railway station house existed in its place near the corner of Bardonia Road and New York State Route 304 until 2014, when it was demolished to make way for a CVS.

Today, Bardonia does not have rail service; its nearest railway station is 2.5 miles to the south at Nanuet. Bardonia is provided by Rockland Coaches Bus Routes 11A, 49, and 49J, with service to New York City's Port Authority Bus Terminal and to various locations throughout Midtown Manhattan.

Notable person
 Steven Mercurio (b. 1956), composer conductor

References

Census-designated places in New York (state)
Hamlets in New York (state)
Census-designated places in Rockland County, New York
Hamlets in Rockland County, New York